Joffrey Pollet-Villard (born 1992) is a French freestyle skier. He won a silver medal in halfpipe at the FIS Freestyle Ski and Snowboarding World Championships 2015, behind Kyle Smaine.

References

External links 
 

1992 births
Living people
French male freestyle skiers